Rig Zardan (also Romanized as Rīg Zardān) is a village in Nakhlestan Rural District, in the Central District of Kahnuj County, Kerman Province, Iran. At the 2006 census, its population was 509, in 104 families.

References 

Populated places in Kahnuj County